Plaza Villa de Madrid (sometimes referred to as "Plaza Cibeles") is a traffic circle in Colonia Roma, Mexico City, where Oaxaca, Durango, Medellín and El Oro streets converge. The Fuente de Cibeles is installed in the center.

References

External links

 

Colonia Roma
Plazas in Mexico City